Ridge Avenue can refer to:

Ridge Avenue (Chicago)
Ridge Avenue (Philadelphia)